Achthophora tristis is a species of beetle in the family Cerambycidae found in Asia in countries such as the Philippines.

References

Lamiini